Plan 9 from Outer Space is a point and click adventure game adaptation of the film of the same name. It was developed at the Irish office of Gremlin Graphics for the Amiga and Atari ST, and was released in 1992. The game was published by Gremlin in Europe and by Konami in the United States. A DOS version was also developed, though only released in the US and Europe. Two editions of the game were made available at retail; the more common version was packaged with a VHS copy of the film, while a rarer version contained only the game.

Background

The game is inspired by the 1957 Z-movie Plan 9 from Outer Space.

Plot

The game starts when the producer notices that the film has been stolen by Bela Lugosi's double. The player must carry out an  epic search of the locations where Plan 9 from Outer Space was filmed to find the six missing reels.

From the back of the DOS version box:

Plan 9. The critics hated it. Bela Lugosi died during it. And his double has stolen it.

Lugosi's replacement is still bitter after 33 years from critics' reviews dubbing his only movie "The Worst Film of All-Time". Even though he remained faceless, he intends to bring glory to the cult classic using more footage of himself and ... colorizing it.  As the studio's Private Eye you'll search over 70 locations, find the 6 reels and screen the film, frame-by-frame, to ensure that the warped actor did not cut Bela from the flick. Using actual digitized film footage, you'll sweat each scene, examining Plan 9 with slow motion, freeze frame, fast forward and rewind.  It's up to you to preserve its original awfulness.

Reception
Computer Gaming Worlds Charles Ardai criticized the game's "cheap" user interface and mediocre graphics and sound, which made him uncertain whether various continuity errors were accidental or intended to satirize the film. Ardai stated that "Plan 9 is a genuinely, intentionally funny piece of work, which puts it several notches above the movie (in my opinion) ... thoroughly enjoyable", and funnier than Zak McKracken and the Alien Mindbenders. He added, however, that as "a licensed product, parasitic on an original work ... its smirking digs at this rather pathetic relic of a movie ... sometimes has the tone of a schoolyard bully taking cheap shots at a defenseless victim". Without the sincerity and "guilelessness" of Wood's film, "In this respect, the game attains a degree of cheapness that even the movie didn't reach, which is quite an accomplishment". The game was reviewed in 1993 in Dragon #190 by Hartley, Patricia, and Kirk Lesser in "The Role of Computers" column. The reviewers gave the game 2 out of 5 stars.

Reviews
Amiga Action (May, 1992)
Zero (Jun, 1992)
Joker Verlag präsentiert: Sonderheft (1993)
Amiga Joker (May, 1992)
Amiga Computing (Oct, 1992)
CU Amiga (May, 1992)
ST Format (Nov, 1992)
Amiga Format (Oct, 1992)
Amiga Power (Oct, 1992)

References

External links

Plan 9 from Outer Space review from Zzap!

1992 video games
Adventure games
Amiga games
Atari ST games
DOS games
Gremlin Interactive games
Konami games
Point-and-click adventure games
Video games based on films
Video games developed in Ireland
Ed Wood
Single-player video games